Robert Angus Ackerman (born 2 March 1961) is a Welsh former dual-code international rugby union and rugby league footballer. In 1983 he toured New Zealand with the British and Irish Lions whilst playing for London Welsh RFC. A centre, he also played club rugby for Newport RFC. He was educated at Christ College Brecon.

He made his Welsh debut on 1 November 1980 against the All Blacks at Cardiff, at the age of 19. He also played rugby league, turning professional on 13 April 1986 when he signed for Whitehaven in Cumbria.  He went on to play for Leeds, Carlisle Border Raiders, and finished his rugby league at Salford in 1993.
He taught at Christ's College, Christchurch, New Zealand and coached the 1st XV in 2008. 
In 2012, Ackerman taught Physical Education at St Patrick's College, Silverstream, New Zealand. Ackerman was also the coach of the Silverstream 1st XV rugby team, leading the team to victory at the 2012 Wellington Premier 1 Finals. He moved to live and work in Melbourne in February 2017, as the Director of Coaching for Rugby at Haileybury College, and is currently a Casual Relief Teacher in Regional Victoria, Australia.

References

External links
Profile at blackandambers.co.uk

1961 births
Living people
British & Irish Lions rugby union players from Wales
Carlisle RLFC players
Dual-code rugby internationals
Leeds Rhinos players
London Welsh RFC players
Newport RFC players
People educated at Christ College, Brecon
Rugby league centres
Rugby league locks
Rugby league players from Ebbw Vale
Rugby league second-rows
Rugby league utility players
Rugby union centres
Rugby union players from Ebbw Vale
Salford Red Devils players
Wales international rugby union players
Wales national rugby league team players
Welsh rugby league players
Welsh rugby union coaches
Welsh rugby union players
Welsh schoolteachers
Whitehaven R.L.F.C. players